Aediodina is a genus of moths of the family Crambidae. It contains only one species, Aediodina quaternalis, which is found on Ambon Island and Taiwan.

References

Spilomelinae
Monotypic moth genera
Moths of Indonesia
Moths of Taiwan
Crambidae genera
Taxa named by Embrik Strand